Eremiascincus timorensis  is a species of skink found in Timor in Indonesia.

References

Eremiascincus
Reptiles described in 1990
Taxa named by Allen Eddy Greer